Jones and the Lady Book Agent is a 1909 American silent comedy film written by Frank E. Woods and directed by D. W. Griffith. Produced by the American Mutoscope and Biograph Company in New York City, the short stars John R. Cumpson, Florence Lawrence, and Flora Finch as the "lady book agent". It is one film in a series of 1908 and 1909 Biograph pictures in which Cumpson and Lawrence performed together as the married couple Mr. and Mrs. Jones. When this comedy was released in May 1909, it was distributed to theaters on a "split reel", which was a single projection reel that accommodated more than one motion picture. It shared its reel with another Biograph comedy short directed by Griffith, The French Duel.

Original contact-print paper rolls of both motion pictures, as well as projectable safety-stock footage of the productions, are preserved in the Library of Congress.

Plot
The comedy opens in the office of Mr. Edward Jones, who is being pestered by a female literary agent to buy a book from her. After leaving his office, the agent overhears Jones making insulting remarks about her. The agent, now seeking revenge, plants incriminating but false evidence of a romantic relationship between them, items that Edward's wife Emma will later see at their home. Emma is enraged when she sees the fabricated evidence, and she literally "beats up her husband". She then locks herself in their bedroom and begins packing her suitcase to go to her mother's home. In the end, however, all is forgiven after an apologetic letter from the agent arrives in which she confesses her scheme against the hapless Mr. Jones.

Further details about the film's storyline are given in a May 10, 1909 bulletin published by Biograph:

Cast

 John R. Cumpson as Mr. Jones
 Florence Lawrence as Mrs. Jones
 Flora Finch as lady book agent	
 Mack Sennett as Dick Smith
 Gertrude Robinson as maid
 Owen Moore in office 
 Harry Solter in office 
 George Gebhardt in office 
 Robert Harron as messenger

Production
The screenplay, written by Frank E. Woods, was produced at Biograph's main studio, which in 1909 was located inside a large renovated brownstone mansion in New York City, in Manhattan, at 11 East 14th Street. Filmed over three dayson January  12, 14, and 25, 1909director Griffith and cinematographer G. W. "Billy" Bitzer shot on interior sets at the studio.

The short's "anonymous" actors
Identifying cast members in early Biograph releases such as Jones and the Lady Book Agent is made more difficult by the fact that the studio, as a matter of company policy, did not begin publicly crediting its performers on screen, in trade publications, or in newspaper advertisements until years after this comedy's release. The names of the cast members in this short were generally unknown to theater audiences in 1909, as were the names of the rest of Biograph's relatively small staff of "photoplayers" and crew, including Griffith himself. At the time of this comedy's release, Florence Lawrence was already gaining widespread celebrity among filmgoers. Few people, though, outside the motion picture industry knew her name, so in 1909 and for the remainder of her time working at Biograph, the actress was referred to by admirers and in news articles in the media simply as "'the Biograph girl'". The studio would not begin to credit or publicize its performers by name until 1913.

Part of the "Jonesy" series

Jones and the Lady Book Agent is the ninth film in a series of thirteen very popular Biograph comedy shorts that were written by Frank E. Woods in 1908 and 1909. Twelve of those films were directed by Griffith and starred the duo of Cumpson and Lawrence as a married couple. Initially, the couple's surname was "Bibbs", but after their first screen performance together, the two actors played as Eddie and Emma Jones for the rest of the series.

Released between September 1908 and September 1909, all of the "Jonesy" films from that period feature Cumpson as the portly and frequently "bewildered" Mr. Jones and Florence Lawrence as his pretty, much younger spouse. The other shorts in the series with Cumpson and Lawrence are A Smoked Husband (1908), Mr. Jones at the Ball (1908), Mrs. Jones Entertains (1909), Mr. Jones Has a Card Party (1909), The Joneses Have Amateur Theatricals (1909), His Wife's Mother (1909), Jones and His New Neighbors (1909), Her First Biscuits (1909), The Peachbasket Hat (1909), Jones' Burglar (1909), and Mrs. Jones' Lover (1908) The general structure and comedic style of Jones and the Lady Book Agent replicated those found in all the releases in the series, common traits described by biographer Kelly R. Brown in her 1999 book Florence Lawrence, The Biograph Girl: America's First Movie Star. "The stories", writes Brown, "were pure slapstick comedy, straight from vaudeville, where usually a misunderstanding escalated into the kind of comic violence which audiences loved."

Release and reception
Although filmed in January 1909, the comedy was not released until nearly four months later, on May 10, an exceedingly long time after the completion of filming in the early silent era, when shorts were edited, having theatrical prints made, were promoted in the "trades", and released with remarkable speed. Usually those tasks required only a matter of a few weeks and, at times, even less time. For example, Jones and His New Neighbors, the release in the "Jones series" that preceded this picture, completed its filming at Biograph on February 25, 1909 and was released less than five weeks later, on March 29. While some delays were due to scheduling considerations with other productions and the appropriate pairing of split reels, an interval of four months between final filming and release was very unusual in 1909, especially for such brief screen subjects. The release of this Jones short was no doubt delayed in part due to its pairing with The French Duel. That comedy took only two days to shoot, but those filming days were widely spaced apart. Biograph production records show that the first day of filming took place on February 23; the second, not until 16 days later, on March 11. Inclement weather might have played a role in that delay, for after filming interior scenes of The French Duel at Biograph's Manhattan studio, Griffith shot needed outdoor footage on location in Coytesville, situated in the borough of Fort Lee, New Jersey.

After their release, the split-reel films circulated to theaters throughout the United States and continued to be promoted for weeks in film-industry publications and for months by newspapers in both large and small communities. The two Biograph shorts were often paired by theater managers with other split-reel releases distributed by Edison Studios in the same period. For example, in June 1909 in Barre, Vermont, the local theater advertised a joint presentation of Jones and the Lady Book Agent and The French Duel with the two Edison comedies Uncle Tom Wins and The Unsuccessful Superstition as well as with a full vaudeville show of skits and "Scotch" singers. This ninth comedy  of the "Jones series", like its predecessors, was popular with audiences, with "very funny" and "clever" being common descriptions of the shorts in contemporary newspaper and theater advertisements.

Preservation status
Photographic prints and a film negative and positive of Jones and the Lady Book Agent survive in the Library of Congress (LC), which holds a 205-foot paper roll of contact prints produced directly frame-by-frame from the comedy's original 35mm master negative. Submitted by Biograph to the United States government in 1909, shortly before the film's release, the roll is part of the original documentation required by federal authorities for motion picture companies to obtain copyright protection for their productions. While the LC's paper roll of the film is certainly not projectable, a negative copy of the roll's paper images was made and transferred onto modern polyester-based safety film stock to produce a positive print for screening. Those copies were made as part of a preservation project carried out during the 1950s and early 1960s by Kemp R. Niver and other LC staff, who restored more than 3,000 early paper rolls of film images from the library's collection and created safety-stock copies.

See also
 D. W. Griffith filmography

Notes

References

External links

 

1909 films
1909 short films
American silent short films
American black-and-white films
Biograph Company films
Films directed by D. W. Griffith
Films shot in New York City
Films shot in New York (state)
Surviving American silent films
1900s American films